Dent's mona monkey (Cercopithecus denti) is an Old World monkey in the family Cercopithecidae found in the Democratic Republic of the Congo, the Congo, Rwanda, western Uganda, and the Central African Republic. It was previously classified as a subspecies of Wolf's mona monkey C. wolfi. Verifying whether they are a subspecies or a separate species is dependent on further research that needs to be done at the contact zone of Cercopithecus denti, Cercopithecus wolfi, and Cercopithecus wolfi elegans, in the forests between the Lualaba and Lomani rivers, south of the junction of the Congo and the Lomani rivers.

References

Dent's mona monkey
Fauna of Central Africa
Mammals of the Republic of the Congo
Mammals of the Democratic Republic of the Congo
Mammals of Rwanda
Mammals of Uganda
Mammals of the Central African Republic
Dent's mona monkey
Dent's mona monkey